Baba Ratan Hindi was a legendary person, alleged to be one of the non-Arab companions of the Islamic prophet Muhammad. Baba was born in Punjab, he was a trader who used to take goods from India to Arabia. There is also a dargah named after him, the Haji Ratan Dargah in Bathinda, India. People who migrated to modern-day Pakistan from modern-day India during the Partition of India in 1947 still remember him.

Description 
No authentic historical reference about Baba Ratan is available, whatever is known about him is based on the prevalent oral traditions. According to local traditions, he was a companion of the Prophet Muhammad and was blessed to live over 700 years. The first reference to Baba Ratan dates back to the 12th century. There are several narratives around him, some ascribing him as a disciple of Gorakhnath. Others associate him with the prophet Muhammad, who foretold his birth at Mecca in Arabia where he travelled during Hajj, before finally settling in Bathinda in Punjab after his reported conversion to Islam.

See also 
List of non-Arab Sahabah
Hazrat Baba Haji Sher Dewan

References 

Non-Arab companions of the Prophet
 
Indian Muslims